Lawes is the surname of the following people:

Andrea Lawes (born 1962), Canadian female curler
Arthur Lawes, 20th century rugby league footballer
 Courtney Lawes (born 1989), rugby union player
 Frank Lawes, English composer
 Henry Lawes, English musician and composer
 John Bennet Lawes, English entrepreneur and agricultural scientist
 John Lawes (company director), Australian company director and former chairman of QBE Insurance
 Jon Lawes, English motoring author
 Kaitlyn Lawes (born 1988), Canadian female curler, Olympic and World champion
 Lewis Lawes, prison warden and an outspoken proponent of prison reform
 Nicholas Lawes, Governor of Jamaica from 1718 to 1722.
 William Lawes, English composer and musician
 William George Lawes, New Guinea pioneer missionary

See also
 Lawes's parotia
 Sir John Lawes School
 Lawes, Queensland, a locality in Australia